Hospital Vilardebó is the only psychiatric hospital in Reducto, Montevideo, Uruguay. It opened on 21 May 1880, named after the physician and naturalist Teodoro Vilardebó. The hospital was originally one of the best of Latin America and in 1915 grew to 1,500 hospital inpatients. Today the hospital is very deteriorated, with broken walls and floors, lack of medicines, beds, and rooms for the personnel. It has an emergency service, outpatient, clinic and internal rooms and employs approximately 610 staff, psychologists, psychiatrists, social workers, administrators, guards, among others. The average patient age is 30 years, more than half of whom arrive by court order; 42% suffer from schizophrenia, 18% suffer from depression and mania  and also a high percentage of drug addicted patients. It has around 300 beds.

References

Hospital buildings completed in 1880
Hospitals in Montevideo
Psychiatric hospitals in Uruguay